The Battle of De Winton Field was a clash between the British Union of Fascists and various anti-fascist demonstrators that took place in Tonypandy, Wales, on 11 June 1936. It was the BUF's last attempt to hold a rally in Wales.

BUF propaganda officer Tommy Moran, accompanied by a small group of Blackshirts and a small black van fitted with loudspeakers, scheduled a rally to be held in a field near the Tonypandy town centre. Despite not advertising the rally, due to the hostile socialist reputation of the Valleys, the local left-wing and anti-fascist groups quickly learned of the rally. Annie Powell, who later became mayor of Penygraig and the first communist mayor in the UK, has stated that the anti-fascist organisers swore that "not even one Welsh sheep will hear the Mosley message."

When the rally was due to be held, around 6000 anti-fascist demonstrators showed up to protest. Protected by police, the fascists attempted to hold their speeches, but were drowned out by jeers from the protestors. The situation soon turned violent, with stones being hurled at the fascists who attempted to continue their speeches. After just half an hour, the fascists were forced to give up the rally and flee.

37 participants in the battle, including several women, would be charged by police on 187 counts of riot, incitement to riot, unlawful assembly, breach of the peace, and disturbing a public meeting. Several of those demonstrators were given six-month prison sentences.

Some of the anti-fascist participants in the battle would later volunteer for the International Brigades, helping fight fascism in the Spanish Civil War. Welsh volunteers would end up representing the largest regional industrial grouping within the British Battalion of the International Brigades.

See also  
 Battle of Stockton – an earlier incident between BUF members and anti-fascists in Stockton-on-Tees on 10 September 1933
 Battle of South Street – a clash between BUF members and anti-fascists in Worthing on 9 October 1934
 Battle of Holbeck Moor – a clash between BUF members and anti-fascists in Leeds on 27 September 1936 
 Battle of Cable Street – a clash between BUF members and anti-fascists in the East End of London on 4 October 1936

References 

Anti-fascism in the United Kingdom
June 1936 events
Political riots
Antisemitic attacks and incidents in Europe
Fascism in Wales
1936 in Wales
History of Rhondda Cynon Taf
International Brigades